Zhaozu is the atonal romanization of several Chinese temple names. It may refer to:

Shilu (Jurchen) ( 11th century), Jurchen chieftain of the Wanyan tribe, honored as Zhaozu in the Jin dynasty
Mengtemu (1370–1433), Jurchen chieftain of the Odoli tribe, honored as Zhaozu in the Qing dynasty

Temple name disambiguation pages